The Battle of Los Angeles tournament (the BOLA) is an annual independent wrestling tournament in North America, run and promoted by Pro Wrestling Guerrilla (PWG). It is the flagship event of PWG. Over the years, the tournament has featured numerous notable wrestlers such as famous Total Nonstop Action Wrestling stars A.J. Styles and Christopher Daniels, future WWE world champions Kevin Steen (Kevin Owens), Bryan Danielson (Daniel Bryan), Tyler Black (Seth Rollins) and Drew Galloway (Drew McIntyre), future AEW world champion Kenny Omega and future Impact world champions Brian Cage, Pentagón Jr., Chris Sabin, Rich Swann, Sami Callihan, John Hennigan (Johnny Impact), Austin Aries and Eddie Edwards.

The tournament setup
The number of participants have often changed over the years. In the first year of the Battle of Los Angeles, there were sixteen participants, with eight opening round matches, four quarterfinal matches, two semifinal matches, and a final. In 2006 the tournament was expanded to 24 participants, which caused the addition of another eight person bracket and created three semifinals matches and an elimination three-way final match. In 2008 the tournament returned to its 16-man format. In 2011, the tournament was completely revamped, taking place for the first time as a one night tournament with only eight participants. In 2014, the tournament reverted to a 24-man format held over three nights. The first two nights are all first-round matches, while the third night contains the quarter-finals and semi-finals before culminating in a three-way match. In 2022, the tournament was reduced to sixteen participants.

All nights also feature non-tournament special attractions, which are usually tag-team matches involving tournament participants from other nights or eliminated wrestlers. Titles are also occasionally defended on these events.

The tournament winner is awarded a title shot for the PWG World Championship. The champion himself often participates in the tournament and if some other wrestler wins the tournament then he is entitled to a title shot. So far, no champion has won the tournament. There have been a few instances where the winner did not receive a title shot. For example, the 2006 winner Davey Richards cashed in on a PWG World Tag Team Championship opportunity instead of challenging for the World Championship. The 2007 winner CIMA did not invoke his title shot while the 2008 winner Low Ki left PWG immediately after winning the tournament due to signing with WWE. The 2009 tournament was itself contested for the vacant PWG World Championship.

Winners, dates, venues and main events

Championship match for winner
 – Championship victory
 – Championship match loss
 – Did not receive title match

The 2009 Battle of Los Angeles winner did not receive a title match as the tournament itself was for the vacant PWG World Championship. Kenny Omega defeated Roderick Strong in the tournament final to win the vacant title.

References

External links
The Website of Pro Wrestling Guerrilla (Requires Macromedia Flash)

Professional wrestling tournaments
Professional wrestling in Los Angeles
Recurring events established in 2005
 
Pro Wrestling Guerrilla events